An American Girl: Isabelle Dances Into the Spotlight (2014) is the eighth film in the American Girl series, starring Erin Pitt as Isabelle Palmer, along with Melora Hardin, Grace Davidson as Jade Palmer, Devyn Nekoda as Luisa, Genneya Walton as Renata, Alyssa Trask as Emma, Avery Trask as Hip Hop Dancer,  Daniel Fathers, Kolton Stewart, Mathew Edmondson, and Saara Chaudry. The screenplay was written by Jessica O'Toole and Amy Rardin. The movie was directed by Vince Marcello. It was released direct-to-video on July 22, 2014, before being broadcast on Disney Channel on August 9, 2014.

The film revolves around Isabelle Palmer, a 9-year-old dancer and aspiring fashion designer from Washington, D.C., as she studies at a prestigious performing-arts school with her older sister Jade and her best friend Luisa. It was shot in Toronto, Ontario, Canada.

Cast
 Erin Pitt as Isabelle Palmer, the 9-year-old protagonist of the film who loves dancing even though she struggles. Apart from dancing, she loves sewing. 
 Grace Davidson as Jade Palmer, Isabelle's older sister who is 12 years old. She takes dancing very seriously, and is one of the best dancers at Anna Hart.
 Genneya Walton as Renata, a rich and spoiled girl who bullies Isabelle. She feels like her parents don't pay attention to her that much.
 Devyn Nekoda as Luisa, Isabelle's best friend who's very into modern dance. She hates it whenever Renata or anyone else is rude to Isabelle.
 Melora Hardin as Nancy Palmer, Isabelle's mom who is a textile artist. She was also hired to design the costumes for the Nutcracker production.
 Tanya Howard, as Jacqueline "Jackie" Sanchez, a famous ballerina whom Isabelle and Jade look up to. She played the Sugar Plum Fairy in the Nutcracker.
 Daniel Fathers as Mr. Kosloff, the director of the Nutcracker who is very strict when it comes to ballet. He also studied at Anna Hart when he was younger.
 Jake Simons as Leonardo "Leo" Palmer, Isabelle's dad who is a hospital administrator, and also plays the drums in a band. His band consists of him, Uncle Davi (Luisa's dad), and some others.
 Alyssa Trask as Emma, Renata's friend who also bullies Isabelle when on by Renata's side. She doesn't have much dialogue throughout the film.
 Saara Chaudry as Chloe, a girl in a wheelchair who looks up to Isabelle. After watching Isabelle in the Halloween Benefit, she asked for an autograph.

Release 
The direct-to-DVD film was released on DVD and Blu-ray on July 22, 2014, and aired on the Disney Channel on August 9, 2014.

Awards 
In 2014, the film received the National Parenting Publications (NAPPA) Silver Award. The association enjoyed the film because of the cast, sets, and performances. They stated "It is truly outstanding – particularly the ballet performances". The director of the movie, Vince Marcello, was also nominated for a Directors Guild of America Award in 2014. He was nominated for an Outstanding Directorial Achievement in Children's Programs award and he did not win.

References

External links
 
 
 An American Girl: Isabelle Dances Into the Spotlight

2014 films
Films based on American novels
Films set in Washington, D.C.
American children's films
Isabelle Dances Into the Spotlight
Films about fashion
Films about ballet
American dance films
American musical films
Films shot in Toronto
Universal Pictures direct-to-video films
Films directed by Vince Marcello
2010s English-language films
2010s American films
2014 directorial debut films